FC Vestsjælland, also known as FCV Vikings, is a professional Danish football club currently playing in the Danish Superliga. They play their home matches at Harboe Arena Slagelse in Slagelse, which has a capacity of 10,000 (3,300 seats). During the 2014/15 campaign they will be participating in the Danish Superliga.

Competitions

Players in / out

In

Out

Danish Superliga

League table

References

External links
Official Site
Slagelse B&I
FCV Vikings Divisionsholdet

FC Vestsjælland
Vestsjaelland